Markos Dimos (born 12 August 1972) is a Greek former professional footballer who played as a midfielder.

References

1972 births
Living people
Greek expatriates in Germany
Greek footballers
Kallithea F.C. players
PAS Giannina F.C. players
Aris Thessaloniki F.C. players
OFI Crete F.C. players
Apollon Smyrnis F.C. players
Super League Greece players
Association football midfielders
Greek football managers
Ethnikos Piraeus F.C. managers
Ionikos F.C. managers
Fokikos F.C. managers
Ilisiakos F.C. managers
AEK Athens F.C. non-playing staff
Footballers from Düsseldorf